Aadat is a 2004 studio album by the Pakistani band Jal.

The album features three bonus tracks (Dr. Zeus & Kais Mix) and has an exclusive bonus VCD with all Jal videos.

Copyright dispute
Atif Aslam released his debut solo album Jal Pari after he left the band, which included some songs from Aadat: "Lamhey" (titled as "Bheegi Yaadein" on Jal Pari), "Dil Haarey" (titled as "Ankhon Se" on Jal Pari) and "Rangon Mein" (titled as "Zindagi" on Jal Pari). This led to a dispute between Aslam and Jal about who owned the rights to the songs, as Mumtaz took the dispute to court. However, the final statement from the court went somewhat in favour of both the artists as the songs which were included in both the artist albums were compositions of both Aslam and Mumtaz. However, Aslam was prohibited from using Jal's name and performing the disputed songs. Aslam went on to sing the same songs in India, in fact copying the exact tune of "Woh Lamhey" for the Indian movie Zeher. Later, in a statement Jal the band pardoned Aslam, which finally ended the dispute between the musicians.

Track listing
All songs are written by Goher Mumtaz.

Personnel
All information is taken from the CD.

Jal
 Farhan Saeed – lead vocals
 Goher Mumtaz – lead guitar, vocal
 Aamir Sheraz – bass guitar

Production
Produced by Zulfiqar Jabbar Khan and Mekaal Hasan
Recorded and mixed at Xth Harmonic Studio, Lahore, Punjab
Guitar sound engineer – Goher Mumtaz
Assisted by Zulfiqar J. Khan

References

External links 

 

2004 debut albums
Jal (band) albums